Katharina Innerhofer (born 17 January 1991) is an Austrian biathlete. She was born in Zell am See.

She competed at the Biathlon World Championships 2012 and 2013, and at the 2014 Winter Olympics in Sochi.

On 6 March 2014 Innerhofer won her first World cup event by finishing first in a sprint competition in Pokljuka. Before this victory her best result in the World Cup was 22nd place in an individual race in Ruhpolding. It was also a first ever victory in the World Cup for an Austrian female biathlete.

Biathlon results
All results are sourced from the International Biathlon Union.

Individual victories
1 victory (1 Sp)

*Results are from UIPMB and IBU races which include the Biathlon World Cup, Biathlon World Championships and the Winter Olympic Games.

References

External links

 

1991 births
Living people
People from Zell am See
Austrian female biathletes
Biathletes at the 2014 Winter Olympics
Biathletes at the 2018 Winter Olympics
Biathletes at the 2022 Winter Olympics
Olympic biathletes of Austria
Sportspeople from Salzburg (state)